The 3rd Commando Brigade is one of the 12 infantry brigades designated as commando in Turkish Land Forces. It's under the 7th Corps and is headquartered at Siirt. The unit was involved in the Operation Olive Branch (2018) in Syria and is actively involved in the Kurdish–-Turkish conflict. It was professionalized in 2010.

See also 

 List of commando units#Turkey

References 

Commando brigades of Turkey